The 1924 Rutgers Queensmen football team represented Rutgers University as an independent during the 1924 college football season. In their first season under head coach John Wallace, the Queensmen compiled a 7–1–1 record and outscored their opponents, 249 to 98. The team was undefeated through eight games but lost, 12-7, to Bucknell in the final game of the season.

Schedule

References

Rutgers
Rutgers Scarlet Knights football seasons
Rutgers Queensmen football